F.E.A.R. is a series of horror-themed first-person shooter video games.

F.E.A.R. may also refer to:

F.E.A.R. (video game), the first game in the F.E.A.R. series
F.E.A.R. (album), an album by Papa Roach
F.E.A.R. (Forgotten, Enslaved, Admired, Released), an album by Dawn of Destiny
Fuck Everyone and Run (F E A R), an album by Marillion
"F.E.A.R." (song), a song by Ian Brown
"F.E.A.R.", a song by Testament from the album The Formation of Damnation
 FEAR (terrorist group), a 2011–2012 American right-wing terrorist group
 Forfeiture Endangers American Rights, or FEAR, an American activist group opposed to asset forfeiture

See also
 Fear (disambiguation)